Silver Springs is a census-designated place (CDP) in Copper River Census Area, Alaska, United States. At the 2020 census the population was 111, down from 114 in 2010.

Geography

Demographics

Silver Springs first appeared on the 2000 U.S. Census as a census-designated place (CDP).

As of the census of 2000, there were 130 people, 46 households, and 35 families residing in the CDP. There were 55 housing units at an average density of 19.1/sq mi (7.4/km2). The racial makeup of the CDP was 86.15% White, 8.46% Native American, 2.31% from other races, and 3.08% from two or more races.

There were 46 households, out of which 50.0% had children under the age of 18 living with them, 69.6% were married couples living together, 4.3% had a female householder with no husband present, and 23.9% were non-families. 23.9% of all households were made up of individuals, and 6.5% had someone living alone who was 65 years of age or older. The average household size was 2.83 and the average family size was 3.34.

In the CDP, the age distribution of the population shows 38.5% under the age of 18, 0.8% from 18 to 24, 32.3% from 25 to 44, 24.6% from 45 to 64, and 3.8% who were 65 years of age or older. The median age was 35 years. For every 100 females, there were 120.3 males. For every 100 females age 18 and over, there were 116.2 males.

The median income for a household in the CDP was $53,750, and the median income for a family was $74,583. Males had a median income of $55,208 versus $28,750 for females. The per capita income for the CDP was $23,464. There were 6.9% of families and 7.4% of the population living below the poverty line, including 11.4% of under eighteens and none of those over 64.

References

Census-designated places in Alaska
Census-designated places in Copper River Census Area, Alaska
Census-designated places in Unorganized Borough, Alaska